Arsal Sheikh (born 22 January 1997) is a Pakistani cricketer. He made his List A debut on 28 April 2016 for Islamabad in the 2016 Pakistan Cup. Prior to his debut, he was named in Pakistan's squad for the 2016 Under-19 Cricket World Cup. He made his Twenty20 debut on 31 August 2016 for Lahore Whites in the 2016–17 Cool & Cool Present Jazz National T20 Cup. He made his first-class debut for Islamabad in the 2016–17 Quaid-e-Azam Trophy on 22 October 2016.

The son of influential PCB official Shakeel Sheikh, his selection in both the national U-19 team in 2016 and, more recently, the Islamabad squad during the Regional One Day Cup in 2016/2017, despite the lukewarm domestic performances, have pushed many analysts to talk of nepotism.

References

External links
 

1997 births
Living people
Pakistani cricketers
Islamabad cricketers
Lahore Whites cricketers
Punjab (Pakistan) cricketers
Cricketers from Islamabad